Tebenna balsamorrhizella is a moth of the family Choreutidae. It is known from northern North America, including Montana, Utah, British Columbia and Alberta.

References

External links
mothphotographersgroup

Tebenna
Moths described in 1904